Geld oder Leben! ("Your Money or Your Life!") is an album by the Austrian band Erste Allgemeine Verunsicherung.

Released in Germany in 1985 on catalogue number EMI Columbia 1333631 on the vinyl format and then reissued in 1986 EMI Columbia 1333631, also on vinyl but with a different cover.

In 1986, the album was also reissued on CD in Germany, on catalogue number EMI Columbia 7462302.

This album was released three times on cassette tape in The Netherlands, two of them in 1985, one on catalogue number EMI Columbia 1333634 and the other on catalogue number EMI Columbia 33394-8. In 1987, Geld oder Leben! was certified three times platinum in Austria.

The third issue was in 1991 on catalogue number EMI Columbia 1333634, with a different cover. In 1991, the album was also reissued on CD in The Netherlands, on catalogue number EMI Austria 7462302.

The tracks which feature "Johnny" at the start of the title are short humorous skits, in which the punchline usually changes the perspective of the previous part from a stereotypical Mafia-style criminal situation into something much more common and everydayish due to words with multiple meanings - e.g. in "Feuer", Johnny asks his boss whether he has fire (for a cigarette), and his boss responds with opening gunfire, and in "Bullen", Johnny warns his boss about "the bulls are coming" (German slang, similar to "the cops are coming"), to which the boss responds "let them in", followed by the noise of a bull stampede.

Track listing

Ba-Ba-Bankrobbery
The band attempted to become better known on the international market by releasing their first – and only – English language single "Ba-Ba-Bankrobbery" in 1986 (apart from a translation of the song Ding Dong).  This English-language version of "Ba-Ba-Banküberfall", which was originally released in 1985 on a single but only in Germany appears on the "Geld oder Leben" album.  "Ba-Ba-Bankrobbery" was released as a single in the UK, Germany, Spain and Canada on both 7" and 12" formats.  The single was also released in Japan on 7" only.

The 12" version (or maxi) appears on the "Kann denn Schwachsinn Sünde sein?" (Can imbecility be a sin?) album, although the 7" English version does not seem to appear on any albums.

The song was basically a rap about how a man with no money can survive and comes up with the idea of robbing a bank as he can't think of any other way.  This track was not very melodic, which did not seem to do it any favours. The "English-German" version is just the English version in a German accent.  It is not a bilingual version as the title may suggest.  The "British-British" version is the same but with a British accent, this appeared as an extended form on the 12" releases along with the standard length "English-German" version and the German-language version itself. As if this was not confusing enough, the 7" labelled the A side as "Ba-Ba-Bankrobbery (English Version??)".

The Guinness Hit Singles book printed this title exactly how it printed on the label which made it look as though the authors were not sure of what they were printing.  This was in the 7th edition, however more recent copies appeared to have dropped the question marks.

The song did not do very well. For instance in the UK, it was in the top 75 for just 4 weeks, peaking at number 68. The standard UK 7" featured the German accent version on the A side and the German-language version on the B side. It may have seemed a better idea to have recorded a few more English language tracks and released them as well in order to gain more international favour like the German band Dschinghis Khan did. The band did not record any further English-language versions of their songs, but used English in some of their regular songs.

Despite the band's failed attempt to gain international fame, they still remain quite popular in Germany and Austria.

Personnel

Erste Allgemeine Verunsicherung

Klaus Eberhartinger: lead vocals
Thomas Spitzer: guitars, vocals, lead vocals on "Helden"
Nino Holm: keyboards, bass, backing vocals
Eik Breit: bass, backing vocals
Anders Stenmo: drums
Mario Bottazzi: backing vocals
Günther Schönberger: backing vocals

Additional personnel
Marion Müller: backing vocals

Certifications

References

1985 albums
Erste Allgemeine Verunsicherung albums
German-language albums